Taglang La or Tanglang La, elevation , is a high altitude mountain pass in the Indian union territory of Ladakh. It is located on the NH3 Leh–Manali Highway. Rail-cum-road tunnels are being constructed under the Taglang La,  Lungalacha La (87 km south of Taglang La) and  Bara-lacha la (171 km south of Taglang La) to cater for the traffic from existing NH3 & under-construction Bhanupli–Leh line.

The elevation in metres on the local signboard is in agreement with SRTM data, however the claim of being world’s second highest motorable pass is no longer accurate after construction of several other higher motorable passes, and it was the 12th highest motorable pass in 2015.

See also 

 Geography of Ladakh
 India-China Border Roads
 List of mountain passes of India

Notes

Mountain passes of Ladakh
Geography of Ladakh
Mountain passes of the Himalayas